Italian submarine Scirè was an , built in 1930s which served during World War II in the Regia Marina. It was named after a northern region of Ethiopia, at the time part of Italian East Africa.

Design and description
The Adua-class submarines were essentially repeats of the preceding . They displaced  surfaced and  submerged.

For surface running, the boats were powered by two  diesel engines, each driving one propeller shaft. When submerged each propeller was driven by a  electric motor. They could reach  on the surface and  underwater.

The boats were armed with six internal  torpedo tubes, four in the bow and two in the stern. They were also armed with one  deck gun for combat on the surface. The light anti-aircraft armament consisted of one or two pairs of   machine guns.

Construction and career

Scirè was launched on 6 January 1938 in OTO's shipyard in La Spezia and commissioned on 25 April 1938. 
At the beginning of the war, she was assigned to 15th Squadron (I Submarine Group) based at La Spezia and was under command of Adriano Pini. On July 10, 1940, while on patrol in the western Mediterranean, French cargo ship SS Cheik (1058 GRT) was torpedoed and sunk by Scirè 54 nm from the Asmare Light, north of Sardinia.

In the summer of 1940 Scirè underwent a series of modifications allowing her to carry SLC. The size of the tower was reduced, her deck gun was removed, and 3 watertight cylinders were mounted on her deck instead to accommodate maiali. These cylinders, each weighing 2.8 tons, could hold up depths down to 90 meters. On September 24, 1940 Scirè, under command of captain Junio Valerio Borghese, sailed from La Spezia for her first special mission to be performed in Gibraltar. In the evening of September 29, upon reaching the Strait of Gibraltar, Sciré received an order from Supermarina to suspend the mission and return to the base as Force H had left the Mediterranean to operate in the Atlantic.

In 1940 Scire made its first foray into the Bay of Gibraltar with the intent of sabotaging the British ships in Gibraltar Harbour with three manned torpedoes. The crew were forced to withdraw and the explosion of the torpedo's only achievement was to tip off the defenders of Gibraltar Harbour. They organised for boats to drop small charges into the water each night that would have proved fatal to any diver in range of the shock wave.

Scirè entered the Bay of Gibraltar again in September 1941 with better results than the previous time. On September 20, 1941 three tankers were attacked and Fiona Shell (2444 GRT, 1892) was sunk whilst other two ships, RFA Denbydale (8154 GRT / 17 000 t) and MS Durham (10893 GRT) were damaged. The Italians decided to create a permanent base in Spain eventually converting a ship called  that was moored off Algeciras into a permanent base for naval sabotage.

Scirè accomplished many missions inside enemy waters. Among these, the most important was the raid on Alexandria launched on 3 December 1941. Scirè left La Spezia carrying three manned torpedoes. At the island of Leros in the Aegean Sea, it secretly loaded six crew for them: Luigi Durand de la Penne and Emilio Bianchi (maiale 221), Vincenzo Martellotta and Mario Marino (maiale 222), Antonio Marceglia and Spartaco Schergat (maiale 223). On 19 December, Scirè reached Alexandria in Egypt and its manned torpedoes entered the harbour. They sank the British battleships  and Queen Elizabeth in shallow water and damaged the tanker Sagona and the destroyer Jervis. All six torpedo-riders were captured and the battleships returned to service after several months of repairs.

Scirè surfaced briefly before sinking during which time she was also shelled by 300 Coast Battery, Royal Artillery. Islay was captained by Lieutenant Commander John Clements Ross of North Shields, Tyne and Wear who was later awarded the Distinguished Service Cross for his actions.

In 1984 a joint Italian-Israeli Navy ceremony was performed, in which the forward section was removed from the submarine and sent to Italy to become part of a memorial. Italian Navy divers also welded the access hatches shut to prevent divers from entering the wreck.

References

External links 
 SUB.net Italia – Sciré missions

Adua-class submarines
World War II submarines of Italy
Lost submarines of Italy
Maritime incidents in August 1942
World War II shipwrecks in the Mediterranean Sea
1938 ships
Ships built by OTO Melara
Ships built in Livorno
Ships lost with all hands
Submarines sunk by British warships